Lieutenant General Maurice Arthur Pope,  (9 August 1889 − 20 September 1978) was a Canadian Army officer, civil engineer, and diplomat.

Military career
Born in August 1889 in Rivière-du-Loup, Quebec, the son of Sir Joseph Pope, Prime Minister John A. Macdonald's principal secretary, and grandson of Sir Henri-Thomas Taschereau and William Henry Pope, he received a Bachelor of Science degree in engineering from McGill University in 1911. He worked for the Canadian Pacific Railway as a construction engineer until he joined the Royal Canadian Engineers as an officer in 1915. He served in the Canadian Expeditionary Force (CEF) in France during World War I.

After the war, he remained in the army and attended the British Army's Staff College, Camberley from 1924 to 1925. Among his fellow Canadian students there were Ernest William Sansom, Harry Crerar and Georges Vanier, both of whom were in the year above, attending from 1923 to 1924. He later attended the Imperial Defence College.

During World War II, he was brigadier general of the Canadian Military headquarters in London, vice-chief of the general staff in Ottawa, Chairman of the Canadian Joint Staff Mission in Washington, head of the Censorship Branch and military staff officer to Prime Minister Mackenzie King. From 1945 to 1950, he was Head of the Canadian Military Mission in Berlin. He retired with the rank of lieutenant-general.

From 1950 to 1953, he was the Canadian Ambassador to Belgium. From 1953 to 1956, he was the Canadian Ambassador to Spain. He retired in 1956 and lived in Ottawa.

His memoir was Soldiers and politicians: the memoirs of Lt.-Gen. Maurice A. Pope C.B., M.C (University of Toronto Press, 1962). He also completed and edited his father's autobiography, Public servant: the memoirs of Sir Joseph Pope (Oxford University Press, 1960).

Bibliography

References

External links
World War I Attestation paper

Heads of Post List
Maurice Arthur Pope at The Canadian Encyclopedia
Generals of World War II 

1889 births
1978 deaths
Canadian military personnel of World War I
Canadian military personnel from Quebec
Canadian civil engineers
Canadian Companions of the Order of the Bath
McGill University Faculty of Engineering alumni
People from Rivière-du-Loup
Taschereau family
Ambassadors of Canada to Belgium
Ambassadors of Canada to Spain
Canadian Expeditionary Force officers
Canadian Army generals of World War II
Graduates of the Staff College, Camberley
Graduates of the Royal College of Defence Studies
McGill University alumni
Royal Canadian Engineers officers
Canadian generals
Canadian recipients of the Military Cross